Pam Tanowitz (born 1969) is an American dancer, choreographer, professor, and founder of the company, Pam Tanowitz Dance. She is a current staff member at Rutgers University's Mason Gross School of the Arts where she teaches dance and choreography. Her work has been performed at notable performance venues such as the Joyce Theater, the Joyce SoHo, and New York Live Arts, Kennedy Center for the Performing Arts.

Prominent dance companies such as the Martha Graham Dance Company, the Paul Taylor Dance Company, and the New York City Ballet have commissioned works by Tanowitz. Gia Kourlas, a dance critic for The New York Times, describes Tanowitz as a "modern choreographer much admired for the way she recharges classical steps."

Biography 
Tanowitz was born in the Bronx, New York, in 1969, and took ballet classes in high school. She earned a BFA in Dance from Ohio State University and an MFA in Dance from Sarah Lawrence College, where she was mentored by Viola Farber Slayton.

Awards and recognition
 2009 Bessie Award
 2010 Foundation for Contemporary Arts Grants to Artists Award
 2011 Guggenheim Fellowship 
 2016 Center For Ballet and the Arts Fellow
 2016 Bessie Juried Award
 2017 Baryshnikov Art Center Cage Cunningham Fellowship
 2019 first-ever Choreographer in Residence at the Richard B. Fisher Center for the Performing Arts at Bard College in Annandale-on-Hudson, New York
 2019 Herb Alpert Award in the Arts
 2020 Doris Duke Artist Award

References

1969 births
Living people
American female dancers
American choreographers
Ohio State University College of Arts and Sciences alumni
Sarah Lawrence College alumni
21st-century American women